The phrase Sutra Pitaka (from the Sanskrit meaning "basket of teachings" or "collection of aphorisms") can refer to:

 the section of the Theravada Buddhist Pali Canon called the "Sutta Pitaka" in Pāli
 the Agamas of various extinct schools of Buddhism
 the Mahayana sutras, a broad genre of Buddhist scriptures that various traditions of Mahāyāna Buddhism accept as canonical

See also 
 Buddhist texts